This was the first edition of the tournament.

Nicolás Jarry and Matheus Pucinelli de Almeida won the title after defeating Jonathan Eysseric and Artem Sitak 6–2, 6–3 in the final.

Seeds

Draw

References

External links
 Main draw

Mexico City Open - Doubles